This is a list of gliders/sailplanes of the world, (this reference lists all gliders with references, where available) 
Note: Any aircraft can glide for a short time, but gliders are designed to glide for longer.

O

Obad
 Obad OS-2 Musa	
 Obad OS-3 Musa Kesedzija

Oberlerchner
(Josef Oberlerchner Holzindustrie)
 Oberlerchner Mg 19
 Oberlerchner Mg 23

Oberti 
(R. Oberti)
 Oberti Falco
 Oberti Gabbiano

Österreichischer Aeroclub
(Österreichischer Aeroclub – Austrian Aero Club)
 Standard Austria

Olansky
 Olansky Straton D-8
 Olansky Straton D-8 Moby Dick
 Olansky Mini Straton D-7

Oller
 Oller Dussel

Oldershaw 
(Vern Oldershaw)
 Oldershaw O-2 Jana-Linn
 Oldershaw O-3

OMRE 
(Országos Magyar Repülő Egyesület Központi Javító Műhelyében – Central Workshop of Hungarian Aeronautical Association)
 OMRE M-30 Fergeteg (whirlwind) – (Lajos Beniczky)
 OMRE Bene – (Hugó Nagy)
 OMRE OE-01 – aka Rubik R-20 – (M. Papp & Erno Rubik)

Onigkeit
(Otto Onigkeit)
 Onigkeit 1938 glider

Onishi 
 Onishi OS-G3

Operation Sigma
(John Sellars & Operation Sigma Ltd)
 Operation Sigma Sigma
 Operation Sigma Type A
 Operation Sigma Type B
 Operation Sigma Type C
 Operation Sigma (Marsden) Sigma

Orlican
(Vyvojova Skupina Orlican / Orlican Chocen)
 Orlican VSO 10 Vosa																																																																																																																																																																																																																																																																																																																																																																																																																																																																																																																																																																																																																																																																																																																																																																																																																																																																																																																																																																																																																																																															
 Orlican VT-116 Orlik II																																																																																																																																																																																																																																																																																																																																																																																																																																																																																																																																																																																																																																																																																																																																																																																																																																																																																																																																																																																																																																																															
 Orlican VT-16 Orlik

Oškinis 
(Bronius Oškinis)
 Oškinis BrO-03 Pūkas
 Oškinis BrO-04 Rūta
 Oškinis BrO-05 Rūta 2
 Oškinis BrO-09A Žioga
 Oškinis BrO-09B Žiogas
 Oškinis BrO-09C Žiogas
 Oškinis BrO-10 Pūkas 3
 Oškinis BrO-11 Pionierius
 Oškinis BrO-11M Zylė
 Oškinis BrO-12
 Oškinis BrO-12 Bangos
 Oškinis BrO-14
 Oškinis BRO-16
 Oškinis BrO-17 S Bitele
 Oškinis BRO-17U Utochka
 Oškinis BrO-17 V Antele
 Oškinis BrO-18 Boruze
 Oškinis BrO-20 Pukelis
 Oškinis BrO-21 Vyturys
 Oškinis BrO-22 Rutele
 Oškinis BRO-23KR Garnys
 Oškinis T-1
 Oškinis T-2

OVL
(Fritz Müller / Ostschweizer Verein für Luftfahrt e. V., Zürich)																																																																																																																																																																																																																																																																																																																																																																																																																																																																																																																																																																																																																																																																																																																																																																																																																																																																																																																																																																																																																																																															
 OVL Austria																																																																																																																																																																																																																																																																																																																																																																																																																																																																																																																																																																																																																																																																																																																																																																																																																																																																																																																																																																																																																																																													
 OVL Zurivogel

Oxford Gliding Club
(Oxford Gliding Club)
 Oxford Gliding Club glider

Ozite
 A. Thoenes / OZITE-Verkaufs GmbH
 Ozite glider

Notes

Further reading

External links

Lists of glider aircraft